Arivaca is a genus of snout moths. It was described by Jay C. Shaffer in 1968.

Species
Arivaca albicostella (Grossbeck, 1917)
Arivaca albidella (Hulst, 1900)
Arivaca artella Shaffer, 1968
Arivaca linella Shaffer, 1968
Arivaca ostreella (Ragonot, 1887)
Arivaca pimella (Dyar, 1906)
Arivaca poohella Shaffer, 1968

References

Anerastiini
Pyralidae genera